Robert Bryan Valicevic (born January 6, 1971 in Detroit, Michigan) is an American former professional ice hockey player. He played six seasons in the National Hockey League, playing with four teams between 1998 and 2004, and also spent several years in various minor and European leagues during his career, which lasted from 1995 to 2008.

Playing career 
Born in Detroit, Michigan, Valicevic has Croatian ancestry. He was drafted in the 6th round (114th overall) of the 1991 NHL Entry Draft by the New York Islanders. He spent four seasons playing with Lake Superior State University in the NCAA from 1991 to 1995 before turning pro in the 1995–96 season. Over that period of time, he recorded 57 goals, 66 assists and 123 points in 161 games.  He then moved to the East Coast Hockey League (ECHL) for the 1995–96 season where he played 60 games with the Louisiana IceGators, scoring 62 points and earning a call-up to the Springfield Falcons of the AHL for two games. He played 8 more games for the IceGators during the 1996–97 season before joining the Houston Aeros of the IHL where he played until 1999, when he earned a spot with the Nashville Predators, playing 19 games in the 1998–99 season.

He spent the next two seasons in the NHL as well, before signing with the Los Angeles Kings organization in August 2001. He spent one season with the Kings, playing only 19 NHL games, the rest of the season spent with the Manchester Monarchs of the AHL. In July 2002, Valicevic signed with the Mighty Ducks of Anaheim organization, with similar results to those in Los Angeles, playing most of the 2002–03 season with the Cincinnati Mighty Ducks of the AHL.  Valicevic was again a free agent following the 2002–03 season, this time signing with the Dallas Stars, again with little success in the 2003–04 season, playing only 7 games with the Stars, the rest spent with the Utah Grizzlies.

Valicevic then moved to the UHL, and played the 2004–05 season with the Flint Generals before moving to Europe, where he had a short stay with TPS. He then went to Germany to play with ERC Ingolstadt of the DEL. He spent 2005–06 and 2006–07 with Ingolstadt and last played for EC KAC of the Erste Bank Eishockey Liga, retiring after the 2007–08 season.

Regular season and playoffs

Awards and honors

 2004–05 UHL Second All-Star Team

References

External links 
 

1971 births
Living people
American men's ice hockey right wingers
American people of Croatian descent
Cincinnati Mighty Ducks players
Dallas Stars players
ERC Ingolstadt players
Flint Generals players
Houston Aeros (1994–2013) players
Ice hockey people from Detroit
EC KAC players
Lake Superior State Lakers men's ice hockey players
Los Angeles Kings players
Louisiana IceGators (ECHL) players
Manchester Monarchs (AHL) players
Mighty Ducks of Anaheim players
Nashville Predators players
New York Islanders draft picks
New York Islanders players
Springfield Falcons players
HC TPS players
Utah Grizzlies (AHL) players
NCAA men's ice hockey national champions